Worhead is the fourth studio album by Newcastle band Little Comets. The album was released via The Smallest Label on 10 March 2017. It includes the singles "Common Things", "The Man Who Wrote Thriller" and "Hunting".

Track listing

Personnel
 Robert Coles - Lead Vocals & Guitar
 Michael Coles - Lead Guitar
 Matthew 'the cat' Hall - Bass

Charts

References

Little Comets albums
2017 albums